Piikkiön rautatieasema is a railway station in the municipality of Kaarina, Piikkiö, near Turku, Finland. It was opened in 1889. The station building, designed by a Finnish architect Bruno Granholm was built in 1888 and later expanded in 1922. The last train stopped at the station on May 26, 1979. 

The station is located in the central area of the town of Piikkiö. 

In September 2016, the railway station was sold to a private buyer.

References

External links

Kaarina
Railway stations in Southwest Finland
Railway stations designed by Bruno Granholm
Railway stations opened in 1889
Railway stations closed in 1979

See also
VR (Finnish Railways)